The Singles may refer to:

 The Singles (Basement Jaxx album) by Basement Jaxx
 The Singles (Bikini Kill album)
 The Singles (Blank & Jones album), 2006
 The Singles (The Bluetones album), 2002
 The Singles (Chisato Moritaka album), 2012
 The Singles (1991 The Clash album)
 The Singles (2007 The Clash album)
 The Singles (1992 Corey Hart album)
 The Singles (Dannii Minogue album)
 The Singles (Edguy album)
 The Singles (Eminem album), 2003
 The Singles (Feeder album)
 The Singles (Goldfrapp album), 2012
 The Singles (Hall & Oates album), 2008
 The Singles (Icehouse album), 1996
 The Singles (Inspiral Carpets album), 1995
 The Singles (Jars of Clay)
 The Singles (Mike Oldfield EP), 1981
 The Singles (Phil Collins album), 2016
 The Singles (Pretenders album), 1987
 The Singles (Soft Cell album)
 The Singles (Tullycraft album)
 The Singles (The Who album), 1984
 The Singles (The Doors album)
 The Singles, album by Lady Gaga, 2010
 The Singles: The First Ten Years by ABBA
 Singles 93–03 by The Chemical Brothers
 The Singles: 1969–1973 by the Carpenters
 The Singles 81→85 by Depeche Mode
 The Singles 86–98 by Depeche Mode
 Singles '96–'06 by Hooverphonic
 The Singles 1992–2003 by No Doubt
 The Singles: 1996–2006 by the Staind

See also 
 The Singles Album (disambiguation)
 The Singles Collection (disambiguation)
 Single (disambiguation)
 Singles (disambiguation)